was a Japanese samurai of the Sengoku period, who served the Imagawa clan.

Samurai
Year of birth missing
1570s deaths